Two Little Girls in Blue is a musical theatre work composed by Paul Lannin and Vincent Youmans, with lyrics by Ira Gershwin (under the pseudonym "Arthur Francis") and a libretto by Fred Jackson. The musical premiered at George M. Cohan's Theatre on Broadway on May 3, 1921.

History

Background 
The first "conference" for the show was held at the Garden City Hotel, where Lannin worked as a chef. According to Gershwin, "His father wanted him to learn every phase of the hotel business, which didn't include composing." A.L. Erlanger was brought in as producer, though Youmans and Gershwin were "urged to keep in the background," as Erlanger would be hesitant to produce a work with young writers.

1921 Broadway premiere 
The original production, produced by Erlanger and staged by Ned Wayburn, premiered at the George M. Chochan's Theatre in the Broadway Theater District in New York City on May 3, 1921. The opening night cast included Olin Howland, Madeline and Marion Fairbanks, Oscar Shaw, Edward Begley, and Virginia Earle.

The May 4 review in The New York Clipper stated: "The lyrics written by Arthur Francis are the best, and seem to show that there are some lyricists who are still able to write a lyric that rhymes also means something." Despite positive comments, Gershwin later wrote that working with Youmans was not a pleasure, as "he wanted to do everything; write, publish, produce, conduct, and show people down the aisle." Wayburn also gave negative statements: "I'm not satisfied to retire from the calling of Producing Stage Director with the reputation of being 'the world's greatest buck dancer.'"

1975 Off-Broadway revival

An off-Broadway revival was produced in 1978, running only a few weeks.  While all of Gershwin's lyrics remained intact in the score, roughly one third of the score had been lost and was recomposed by Nathan Hurwitz. This production was produced by David Mayhew and Victoria Sanders, starring Alison Bevan in a 99-seat black box theatre beneath CIrcle-in-the-Square downtown on West 4th Street.  It ran for only a few weeks.

Musical numbers 

Act I
 (We're Off on) A Wonderful Trip
 (Your) Wonderful U.S.A
 When I'm With the Girls
 Two Little Girls in Blue
 The Silly Season
 Oh Me, Oh My, Oh You
 You Started Something When You Came Along
 We're Off to India

Act II
 Here, Steward
 The Gypsy Trail††
 Dolly†
 Who's Who With You?
 Just Like You
 There's Something About Me They Like§
 Rice and Shoes (Sweetest Girl)†
 She's Innocent

Act III
 Honeymoon (When Will You Shine for Me?)
 I'm Tickled Silly (Slapstick)
 Orienta

§Additional lyrics by Fred Jackson.
†Additional lyrics by Schuyler Greene.
††Additional lyrics by Irving Caesar.

Notes

External links 

 Two Little Girls in Blue at the Internet Broadway Database

1921 musicals
Broadway musicals
Original musicals